Capital punishment in Vatican City was legal between 1929 and 1969, reserved for attempted assassination of the Pope, but has never been applied there. Executions were carried out elsewhere in the Papal States, which was the predecessor of the Vatican City, during their existence.

Background

The death penalty had support from early Catholic theologians, though some of them such as Saint Ambrose encouraged members of the clergy not to pronounce or carry out capital punishment. Saint Augustine answered objections to capital punishment rooted in the first commandment in The City of God. Augustine's argument is as such: "Since the agent of authority is but a sword in the hand [of God], it is in no way contrary to the commandment 'Thou shalt not kill' for the representative of the state's authority to put criminals to death". Thomas Aquinas and Duns Scotus argued that civil authority to carry out capital punishment was supported by scripture.

Pope Innocent III required Peter Waldo and the Waldensians to accept that "secular power can, without mortal sin, exercise judgement of blood, provided that it punishes with justice, not out of hatred, with prudence, not precipitation" as a prerequisite for reconciliation with the church. During the Middle Ages and into the modern period, the Inquisition was authorized by the Holy See to turn over heretics to secular authority for execution, and the Papal States carried out executions for a variety of offences.

The Roman Catechism (1566) codified the teaching that God had entrusted civil authorities with the power over life and death. Doctors of the Church Robert Bellarmine and Alphonsus Liguori, as well as modern theologians such as Francisco de Vitoria, Thomas More, and Francisco Suárez continued this tradition; Pope Pius XII issued an allocution to medical experts to that effect.

History of the Statute
The Lateran Treaty of 1929 copied from the contemporaneous Italian legal code (concerning attempted assassinations of the King of Italy), providing for capital punishment for anyone who attempted to assassinate the pope within Vatican City.  Article 8 of the Lateran Treaty provides:

There were no attempted assassinations of the pope within Vatican City while the statute was on the books. It was no longer in force in 1981, when Mehmet Ali Ağca attempted to assassinate Pope John Paul II, and in any case Ağca was tried by an Italian court rather than in the Vatican.

Abolition
Pope Paul VI removed the capital punishment statute from the "fundamental law" of Vatican City in 1969, along with other adaptations, four years after closing the Second Vatican Council, announcing the change only in the August 1969 issue of the Gazette, which is published in Latin. The change came to public attention only in January 1971 after reporters accused Paul VI of hypocrisy for his criticisms of planned executions in Spain and the Soviet Union.

See also
Index of Vatican City-related articles

References

Vatican City
Government of Vatican City

Death in Vatican City
1969 disestablishments in Europe
1929 establishments in Vatican City
Human rights in Vatican City